Winter clothing are clothes used for protection against the particularly cold weather of winter. Often they have a good water resistance, consist of multiple layers to protect and insulate against low temperatures.

Winter clothes are especially outerwear like coats, jackets, hats, scarves and gloves or mittens, earmuffs, but also warm underwear like long underwear, union suits and socks. Military issue winter clothing evolved from heavy coats and jackets to multilayered clothing for the purpose of keeping troops warm during winter battles. Several shirts and socks, usually four pairs were standard issue for the U.S. Army during WWII. Winter clothes used for sports and recreation includes ski suits and snowmobile suits.
Many northern cultures use animal fur to make winter clothes.

Gallery

See also
Outerwear
Ski suit
Jacket
Winter Gloves
Selbuvott

References

Clothing by function
Protective gear